In statistics, the standardized mean of a contrast variable (SMCV or SMC), is a parameter assessing effect size. The SMCV is defined as mean divided by the standard deviation of a contrast variable. 
The SMCV was first proposed for one-way ANOVA cases 

and was then extended to multi-factor ANOVA cases
.

Background
Consistent interpretations for the strength of group comparison, as represented by a contrast, are important.  

When there are only two groups involved in a comparison, SMCV is the same as the strictly standardized mean difference (SSMD). SSMD belongs to a popular type of effect-size measure called "standardized mean differences" which includes Cohen's   and Glass's 

In ANOVA, a similar parameter for measuring the strength of group comparison is standardized effect size (SES).  One issue with SES is that its values are incomparable for contrasts with different coefficients. SMCV does not have such an issue.

Concept
Suppose the random values in t groups represented by random variables  have means  and variances , respectively. A contrast variable  is defined by
 
where the 's are a set of coefficients representing a comparison of interest and satisfy .

When  are independent,

Classifying rule for the strength of group comparisons
The population value (denoted by  ) of SMCV can be used to classify the strength of a comparison represented by a contrast variable, as shown in the following table. This classifying rule has a probabilistic basis due to the link between SMCV and c+-probability.

Statistical estimation and inference
The estimation and inference of SMCV presented below is for one-factor experiments. Estimation and inference of SMCV for multi-factor experiments has also been discussed.

The estimation of SMCV relies on how samples are obtained in a study. When the groups are correlated, it is usually difficult to estimate the covariance among groups. In such a case, a good strategy is to obtain matched or paired samples (or subjects) and to conduct contrast analysis based on the matched samples. A simple example of matched contrast analysis is the analysis of paired difference of drug effects after and before taking a drug in the same patients. By contrast, another strategy is to not match or pair the samples and to conduct contrast analysis based on the unmatched or unpaired samples. A simple example of unmatched contrast analysis is the comparison of efficacy between a new drug taken by some patients and a standard drug taken by other patients. Methods of estimation for SMCV and c+-probability in matched contrast analysis may differ from those used in unmatched contrast analysis.

Unmatched samples
Consider an independent sample of size ,

 

from the  group . 's are independent. Let ,

 
 
and 
 

When the  groups have unequal variance, the maximal likelihood estimate (MLE) and method-of-moment estimate (MM) of SMCV are, respectively
 
and

When the  groups have equal variance, under normality assumption, the uniformly minimal variance unbiased estimate (UMVUE) of SMCV is
 

where .

The confidence interval of SMCV can be made using the following non-central t-distribution:
 

where

Matched samples
In matched contrast analysis, assume that there are  independent samples  from  groups ('s), where .

Let  and  be the sample mean and sample variance of the contrast variable , respectively. Under normality assumptions, the UMVUE estimate of SMCV is
 

where 

A confidence interval for SMCV can be made using the following non-central t-distribution:

See also
 Dual-flashlight plot

References

Effect size
Analysis of variance